Kolote P. Vallon (2 January 1900– 14 April 1940) was a social reformer and leader of the Pulaya community in the Cochin State of Kerala. Along with Pandit Karuppan and Chanchan, he played a transformative role in the upliftment of the Pulaya community in Cochin.

Member of the Legislative Council 
Vallon was a two time member of the Cochin Legislative Council, the Maharaja of Cochin having nominated him in 1931 and 1939. He used the platform to champion the cause of the Depressed Classes and labourers. He introduced a resolution seeking government help to students of the Depressed Classes, which the government accepted.

Commemoration 
The K P Vallon Road connecting Kadavanthra Junction to Kadavanthra, in Kochi is named after him. Vrindavanam Venugopalan edited and published a life sketch on Vallon in 1981 which was published by Viswakeralam Daily.

References 
 

Specific

Activists from Kerala
Year of birth uncertain
1940 deaths
Deaths from smallpox
Indian social reformers
People of the Kingdom of Cochin
Dalit activists
20th-century Indian politicians
20th-century Indian scholars
Politicians from Kochi
Scholars from Kochi
1900 births